Un "Sung Stories" is the first solo album by the American roots rock musician Phil Alvin, released in 1986. After promoting the album, Alvin returned to his graduate studies in mathematics.

Production
Sun Ra's Arkestra and the Dirty Dozen Brass Band contributed to the album. The Arkestra played on three homages to Cab Calloway: "The Old Man of the Mountain", "Brother Can You Spare a Dime?" and "The Ballad of Smokey Joe". 

"Daddy Rollin' Stone" is the only track on the album that was composed after World War II.

Critical reception

Trouser Press called Un "Sung Stories" "a delightful solo album of blues, gospel and jazz goodies." Robert Christgau opined that Alvin "loves a good lyric, and if he can't write them or order them up, he has only to ransack his record collection for oldies that are just strange enough." The Sacramento Bee noted that "Alvin has trimmed some of the excessive stylization of some of his Blasters work, and deepened the bluesy feel in his voice."

The Chicago Tribune deemed the album "an offbeat mix of musical Americana that includes gospel, country blues and pop anthems of the 1920s and '30s." The Los Angeles Times wrote that "Alvin's forceful arrangements fuses the material with dark, funny, frightening and inspiring edges ... The result is an album that suggests a heroic grappling with the struggles involved in daily living." The San Francisco Chronicle determined that "the whole enterprise has a slightly esoteric feel, but when the collaborations click, such as the funky 'The Ballad of Smokey Joe' or the rollicking 'Daddy Rollin' Stone', the results provide minor musical gems, unexpected rewards and enough high points to declare Alvin's daring worthwhile."

AllMusic wrote: "Short and sweet, Un 'Sung Stories''' is a true gem that's richly felt in a way a collection of 'old standards' is not expected to be." The Spin Alternative Record Guide'' likened Alvin to a "West-Coast Buster Poindexter," and considered the album "pleasant."

Track listing

References

1986 albums
Slash Records albums